The Oaths of Strasbourg were a military pact made on 14 February 842 by Charles the Bald and Louis the German against their older brother Lothair I, the designated heir of Louis the Pious, the successor of Charlemagne. One year later the Treaty of Verdun would be signed, with major consequences for Western Europe's geopolitical landscape.

Louis the German swore his oath in Romance so that the soldiers of Charles the Bald could understand him. Likewise, the latter recited his in Germanic so that Louis's soldiers would understand.

The Romance section of the Oaths is of special importance to historical linguistics, as it is the oldest extant document in France that was written deliberately and consistently in a form of Romance.

Context 
Centuries after the fall of the Western Roman Empire, Charlemagne, who had conquered much of its former territory, announced its restoration. Upon his death, he passed this realm to his son Louis the Pious, who would in turn pass it to his firstborn son Lothair I. However, the latter's brothers—Charles and Louis—refused to recognize him as their suzerain. When Lothair attempted to invade their lands, they allied against him and defeated him at the Battle of Fontenoy in June 841. Charles and Louis met in February 842 near modern Strasbourg to affirm their alliance by swearing a joint oath against Lothair. The following year the civil war would end with the Treaty of Verdun, in which the three claimants partitioned the Empire amongst themselves.

The Oaths were not preserved in their original form; they were instead copied by the historian Nithard, another grandson of Charlemagne, in a work titled De Dissensionibus Filiorum Ludovici Pii "On the Quarrels of Louis the Pious's Sons". This was a firsthand account, as Nithard had campaigned alongside his cousin Charles the Bald. It was however biased, reflecting the perspective of the allies and casting Lothair as an aggressor and villain.

Louis and Charles swore their oaths not as kings—a term which is never used—but rather as lords, with their respective entourages acting as witnesses. Ostensibly they were acceding to Lothair I's demands as his future 'subjects'.

Although the Oaths are of little political importance, given that they were superseded by the more comprehensive Treaty of Verdun, they are of significant importance to the field of linguistics. As the scholar Philippe Walter wrote:

Manuscript 
Nithard's text has been passed down to us via two manuscripts that are today kept at the National Library of France.

The older manuscript was copied around the year 1000, probably for an abbey in Picardy (either that of Saint-Médard or Saint Riquier). In the fifteenth century it was in the possession of the Abbey of Saint Magloire in Paris. Around 1650 it was bought by the Swedish Queen Christina and transferred to Rome; after her death it was acquired by the Vatican Library. After Napoleon's forces captured Rome, it was transferred back to Paris along with various other historical manuscripts. Napoleon would later return most of the others, but kept this one. It is currently found in the National Library of France under the call number Latin 9768. The Oaths are found on folio #13.

The other manuscript, which is kept in the same library under the call number Latin 14663, is a copy of the former that was made in the fifteenth century.

Romance portion 
Louis the German's oath is recorded as follows:

The army of Charles the Bald swore that:

Germanic portion 
The language reflects an early form of Ripuarian Frankish. Charles the Bald is recorded as saying:This is a close translation of Louis's oath, except that an equivalent to et in aiudha et in cadhuna cosa appears to be missing. The soldiers of Louis the German replied:

This, in turn, was equivalent to the oath sworn by Charles's soldiers.

Linguistic features 
Several scholars consider the Romance portion of the Oaths to have been translated from an unattested Latin original, while others maintain its originality.

According to Hall, the text does not contain any particular features that would mark it as belonging to the future Oïl or Oc groups, with the possible exception of the form tanit 'keep' < *tɛ́ni̯at, which is characteristic of Lorraine. Hall describes the language of the text as "nearly undifferentiated conservative Pre-French".

The difficulty of discerning a particular dialect in the text may be due to a deliberate effort by the author to write in a sort of regional koiné. Cerquiglini further observes that "No Old French text, not even any of the oldest ones, shows dialectical features consistent with only one particular region."

Nevertheless, various other scholars have suggested that the Oaths were written in an early form of Picard, Lyonnais, Lorraine, or Poitevin.

Transcriptions 
The following is a reconstructed pronunciation of Louis's oath and that of Charles's soldiers:

Here are the Romance sections of folio 13r along with digital facsimiles:

Partitions of Charlemagne's empire

See also 
 Kassel Glosses
 Reichenau Glosses

References

Further reading

External links 
 Photos of the manuscripts found at the National Library of France:
 Folio 12v
 Folio 13r
 Folio 13v

842 works
9th-century documents
Diplomatics
History of Europe
History of the French language
Medieval Germany
Oaths
West Germanic languages